Cheyenne Central High School is a public secondary school (grades 9-12) located in Cheyenne, Wyoming, United States. It serves Laramie County School District #1. The high school serves students who attended McCormick JHS, Clawson ES, Davis ES, Deming/Miller ES, Freedom ES, Gilchrist ES, Hobbs ES, Jessup ES, Pioneer Park ES, Willadsen ES, and Saddle Ridge ES in Cheyenne. The current principals are Karen Delbridge, Nicholas Lamp, and Brian Aragon.

History 

Cheyenne High School, the predecessor of Cheyenne Central High School, was the first high school in Wyoming, founded in 1869. The school is a charter member of the North Central Association of Colleges and Secondary Schools. Cheyenne Central High School was first accredited in 1904 and continues to be accredited by that organization and by the Wyoming State Department of Education.

Academics 

Cheyenne Central offers 21 Advanced Placement programs. For the 2012-2013 school year, Cheyenne Central made "Adequate Yearly Progress" in accordance with the Federal No Child Left Behind Act.

JROTC 

The program was started in 1903, originally offering the class at Cheyenne High School (now called Cheyenne Central High School). It was initially run as a cooperative effort between the Wyoming National Guard and the Laramie County School Board. Since 1916, the program has been a cooperative effort between the school district and the U.S. Army. This unit is currently, as of October 14, 2022, an Honor Unit with Distinction (top 10% in the nation).

Athletics 

The school offers competitive sports including men's basketball, women's basketball, cheerleading, cross country, dance, football, golf, men's soccer, women's soccer, men's swimming & diving, women's swimming & diving, tennis, track (indoor and outdoor), volleyball, and wrestling.

Notable alumni 
 Bryce Meredith (Class of 2013), amateur wrestler: two-time NCAA Division I finalist
 Harriet Elizabeth Byrd (Class of 1944), first African-American member of the Wyoming legislature
 Boyd Dowler (Class of 1955), former NFL player with the Green Bay Packers; 1959 rookie of the year and five NFL titles
 Jim Eliopulos (Class of 1977), former NFL player
 Chris LeDoux (Class of 1969), country music singer and rodeoer
 Monte Olsen, ski instructor and member of the Wyoming House of Representatives
 Leslie Osterman (Class of 1966), member of the Kansas House of Representatives and retired health systems analyst from Wichita, Kansas
 Don Westbrook (Class of 1972), former NFL player
 Alvin Wiederspahn, former member of the Wyoming Senate and Wyoming House of Representatives, husband of Cynthia Lummis

References

External links 
 Official website

Buildings and structures in Cheyenne, Wyoming
Public high schools in Wyoming
Schools in Laramie County, Wyoming